Crete is a city in Saline County, Nebraska, United States. The population was 7,099 at the 2020 census.

History
The railroad was extended to the area in 1870, bringing settlers. In 1871, two rival towns merged to form a new town, which was named after Crete, Illinois, the former hometown of an early settler. The name was also chosen to conform with the alphabetical stops on the new Burlington & Quincy Railroad line traveling westward from Lincoln: Berks, Crete, Dorchester, Exeter, Fairmont, Grafton, Huxley, etc. Crete was once a contender for county seat.

On February 18, 1969, Crete was the site of a railroad accident that released a fog of anhydrous ammonia fumes from a ruptured railroad tank car, killing five residents and seriously injuring 11 others in their homes.  Another three people, hoboes who had been riding on the Chicago, Burlington and Quincy Railroad freight train as it traveled from Denver to Chicago, died of injuries received in the train derailment.

Geography
Crete is located at  (40.624790, -96.959178).

Climate

Government
Crete uses a city council with six council persons.

Demographics

2010 census
At the 2010 census there were 6,960 people, 2,199 households, and 1,447 families living in the city. The racial makeup of the city was 70.6% White, 1.0% African American, 0.5% Native American, 2.5% Asian, 0.1% Pacific Islander, 23.1% from other races, and 2.2% from two or more races. Hispanic or Latino people of any race were 35.7%.

Of the 2,199 households 38.2% had children under the age of 18 living with them, 49.9% were married couples living together, 9.8% had a female householder with no husband present, 6.1% had a male householder with no wife present, and 34.2% were non-families. 27.2% of households were one person and 12.6% were one person aged 65 or older. The average household size was 2.79 and the average family size was 3.41.

The median age was 28.5 years. 25.7% of residents were under the age of 18; 19.8% were between the ages of 18 and 24; 23.6% were from 25 to 44; 20% were from 45 to 64; and 10.9% were 65 or older. The gender makeup of the city was 49.8% male and 50.2% female.

2000 census
At the 2000 census, there were 6,028 people, 2,078 households, and 1,317 families living in the city. The population density was 2,541.9 people per square mile (982.0/km). There were 2,188 housing units at an average density of 922.7 per square mile (356.5/km). The racial makeup of the city was 86.48% White, 0.76% African American, 0.73% Native American, 3.27% Asian, 0.03% Pacific Islander, 6.90% from other races, and 1.82% from two or more races. Hispanic or Latino people of any race were 13.50% of the population.

Of the 2,078 households 34.2% had children under the age of 18 living with them, 49.4% were married couples living together, 8.9% had a female householder with no husband present, and 36.6% were non-families. 29.2% of households were one person and 15.4% were one person aged 65 or older. The average household size was 2.54 and the average family size was 3.13.

The age distribution was 23.8% under the age of 18, 20.1% from 18 to 24, 24.3% from 25 to 44, 17.2% from 45 to 64, and 14.6% 65 or older. The median age was 30 years. For every 100 females, there were 96.7 males. For every 100 females age 18 and over, there were 93.8 males.

The median household income was $34,098, and the median family income  was $43,295. Males had a median income of $30,778 versus $25,459 for females. The per capita income for the city was $14,936. About 7.8% of families and 12.7% of the population were below the poverty line, including 11.3% of those under age 18 and 11.0% of those age 65 or over.

Points of interest
 Doane University
 Doane College Historic Buildings
 Doane College Osterhout Arboretum

Notable people
 Dana Altman, college basketball coach
 John William Chapman, Lieutenant Governor of Illinois
 Teri Steer, Olympic shot putter
 Harold Montelle Stephens, United States federal judge

References

External links

Cities in Nebraska
Cities in Saline County, Nebraska
Populated places established in 1871
1871 establishments in Nebraska